The Monte-Carlo Beach is a hotel located in Roquebrune-Cap-Martin, a commune in the Alpes-Maritimes department in southeastern France.  Situated on the Côte d'Azur just outside Monaco proper, the Monte-Carlo Beach hotel belongs to the Société des bains de mer de Monaco. It was built in 1929 by the architect Roger Seassal and was redesigned in 2009 by India Mahdavi.

Location 
Despite its ownership and name, the Monte-Carlo Beach Hotel is in Roquebrune-Cap-Martin, France rather than Monaco. It joins three hotels in the latter principality, the Hôtel de Paris Monte-Carlo, Hôtel Hermitage Monte-Carlo, and Monte-Carlo Bay Hotel & Resort, overlooking the Mediterranean Sea.

In 2009, the Monte-Carlo Beach became a member of Relais & Châteaux.

Features 
 40 rooms including 14 suites
 Three restaurants: The Deck, Elsa and La Vigie
 A large reception room: The Deck
 Two meeting rooms
 A nightclub: The Sea Lounge
 A spa: the Monte-Carlo Beach SPA

See also 
 Monte Carlo

Notes

External links 

 Official website of the Monte-Carlo Beach
 Official website of the Société des Bains de Mer de Monaco

Hotels in Monaco
Palaces in Monaco
1929 establishments in Monaco
Hotels established in 1929